Robert Appleyard may refer to:

 Bob Appleyard (1924–2015), English cricketer
 Robert Appleyard (bishop) (1917–1999), bishop of the Episcopal Diocese of Pittsburgh